"The Naked Sun" is a song by Swedish singer Pandora. It was released in April 1995 as the third single from her second studio album Tell the World (1995). It features an uncredited rap by M-Fuse. The song became Pandora's fifth top 5 single in Finland.

Track listing
CD Single
 "The Naked Sun" (Radio Edit) - 3:58
 "The Naked Sun" (The Bedouin House Camp) - 4:16
 "The Naked Sun" (Tell The Sun Mix) - 3:40

Chart performance

References

1995 singles
1994 songs
Pandora (singer) songs
English-language Swedish songs
Virgin Records singles